Li Xun (born 2 January 1992 in Tumen, Yanbian) is a Chinese professional footballer of Korean descent who currently plays for as a forward or attacking midfielder for Shijiazhuang Ever Bright.

Club career
Li Xun started his professional football career in 2013 when he was promoted to China League One side Yanbian FC's first team squad. He quickly established himself within the first team and became a regular starter in the season. On 18 August 2013, he scored his first senior goal in a 3–1 defeat against Shenyang Shenbei. He played 22 league matches and scored 2 goals in the 2015 season as Yanbian won promotion to the Chinese Super League. On 19 February 2016, after an unsuccessful trial with Beijing Guoan, he signed a new contract with Yanbian. On 5 March 2016, Li made his Super League debut in the first match of 2016 season against Shanghai Shenhua, coming on as a substitute for Yoon Bit-garam in the 91st minute in a game that ended in a 1-1 draw.

Despite being an integral member of the squad that helped maintain Yanbian's status within the top tier throughout the 2016 Chinese Super League season, Li was unceremoniously dropped to the teams bench throughout the whole of the 2017 Chinese Super League and saw Yanbian relegated at the end of the season. Speculation within the Chinese media suggested that the owners were unhappy with how Li's contract negotiations went and that he was actively looking to move. In March 2018, Li transferred to China League Two side Jilin Baijia on loan. In February 2019, Yanbian were in financial difficulties and Li joined Shijiazhuang Ever Bright.

Career statistics
Statistics accurate as of match played 31 December 2020.

Honours

Club
Yanbian FC
 China League One: 2015

References

External links

1992 births
Living people
Chinese footballers
People from Yanbian
Yanbian Funde F.C. players
Cangzhou Mighty Lions F.C. players
Chinese Super League players
China League One players
China League Two players
Chinese people of Korean descent
Association football forwards